Protopelagonemertidae is a family of worms belonging to the order Polystilifera.

Genera:
 Calonemertes Coe, 1945
 Pendonemertes Brinkmann, 1917
 Plotonemertes Brinkmann, 1917
 Protopelagonemertes Brinkmann, 1917

References

Polystilifera
Nemertea families